The International Road Transport Union (IRU) is the global road transport organization, which upholds the interests of bus, coach, taxi and truck operators to ensure economic growth and prosperity via the sustainable mobility of people and goods by road transport.

History 

The International Road Transport Union (IRU) was founded in Geneva on 23 March 1948, one year after the United Nations Economic Commission for Europe (UNECE), to expedite the reconstruction of war-torn Europe through facilitated international trade by road transport.

The IRU started as a group of national road transport associations from eight western European countries: Belgium, Denmark, France, the Netherlands, Norway, Sweden, Switzerland and the United Kingdom.

A global industry federation of national Member Associations and Associate Members in 73 countries on the 5 continents, the IRU today represents the interests of bus, coach, taxi and truck operators worldwide, from large fleets to individual owner-operators. It aims to research and offer solutions to road transport issues and to aid in the synthesis and simplification of transportation regulations and practice.

Activities 
Activities include:

 partnership - among all its active and associate members and with related organizations and industries to define, develop and promote policies of common interest;
 monitoring - all activities, legislation, policies and events that impact the road transport industry, responding to and cooperating with all actors involved;
 strategic reflection - on global challenges of energy, competition and social responsibility, drawing on the strengths and expertise of its members channeled through the IRU Commissions and Working Parties;
 dialogue - with intergovernmental bodies, international organizations and all other stakeholders concerned by the road transport industry, including the public at large;
 cooperation - with policy makers, legislators and opinion-makers, in order to contribute to informed and effective legislation, striking the right balance between the needs and interests of all;
 public-private partnerships with relevant authorities to implement legal instruments such as the TIR Convention under UN mandate or concrete transnational projects such as the reopening of the Silk Road;
 communication - of the role and importance of the road transport industry, of its position on various issues and of reliable data and information;
 provision of practical services and information, to road transport operators, such as the latest fuel prices, waiting times at borders, secure parking areas, professional training, legislative developments, legal assistance, etc.
 training - to promote professional competence in the sector, improve the quality of services it offers and ensure compliance of road transport training standards with international legislation, through the IRU Academy.

TIR (Transports Internationaux Routiers) 

IRU started the TIR System Transports (Internationaux Routiers) in the late 1940s, helping a war-torn Europe to rebuild devastated trade and commercial links.

By 1959, the successful system led to the United Nations TIR Convention, still in place today with almost 70 contracting parties – nations and multinational bodies – on four continents, and overseen by the United Nations Economic Commission for Europe (UNECE).

With the continued expansion of TIR, and the benefits it has brought across the Eurasian landmass, many countries in Africa, Asia, the Middle East and South America are now joining the system.

References

External links

Road transport organizations
International trade organizations
Organisations based in Geneva
International road transport
1948 establishments in Switzerland